Events in the year 1704 in Norway.

Incumbents
Monarch: Frederick IV

Events
16 February - The Norwegian Slottsloven commission was formed. 
Moss Jernverk is established.

Arts and literature

Births

Deaths

2 February – Frederik Splet, government official
31 March – Christian Stockfleth, civil servant (born 1639).

See also

References